Eduard Vladislavovich Bogdanov (born 4 January 1968) is a Russian professional football coach and a former player.

Playing career
He played for the main squad of FC Dynamo Moscow in the USSR Federation Cup.

External links
 

1968 births
People from Elista
Living people
Soviet footballers
Russian footballers
FC Elista players
FC Dynamo Moscow players
FC Chernomorets Novorossiysk players
FC Dynamo Stavropol players
Russian football managers
FC Elista managers
FC Dynamo Stavropol managers
FC Metallurg Lipetsk players
Association football midfielders
FC Neftekhimik Nizhnekamsk players
FC Chita players
Sportspeople from Kalmykia